Oricia hillmani is a moth of the family Notodontidae first described by James S. Miller in 2008. It is found along the western slope of the Ecuadorian Andes at elevations ranging between 250 and 900 meters.

The length of the forewings is 17–19 mm for males and 19 mm for females. The ground color of the forewings is light chocolate brown. All wing veins are lined with light-yellow to buff-colored scales. The hindwings are almost entirely gray brown, but slightly lighter along the anal margin.

Etymology
This species is named in honor of Jan Hillman, who has collected a paratype of this species.

References

Moths described in 2008
Notodontidae of South America